Parliamentary elections were held in Somalia on 30 March 1964. The result was a victory for the Somali Youth League (SYL), which won 69 of the 123 seats.

Background
The elections were the first to be held since the merger of British Somaliland and Italian Somaliland created Somalia in 1960. After the union, the two territories' parliaments had merged, retaining the same number of seats as in the 1960 elections in British Somaliland and the 1959 elections in Italian Somaliland.

Results

References

Parliamentary election
Somalia
Elections in Somalia
Somali parliamentary election
Election and referendum articles with incomplete results